Ahcene Aït-Abdelmalek is a German-born Algerian football coach who coached Burundi from 2015 to 2016. He was appointed as a new coach for South Sudan in February 2018, leaving in September 2018.

References

1975 births
Living people
Algerian football managers
Burundi national football team managers
South Sudan national football team managers
21st-century Algerian people